This is a list of compositions by Anton Diabelli.



Music for piano

Two hands

 The First Lessons on the Piano, Op. 125
 Le bouquetier, Op. 151
 100 Cadenzas, Op. 154
 Sonatinas, Op. 168
 Allegretto in C major
 Glorreiche Rückkehr Franz des Allgeliebten
 2 Potpourris aus "Rigoletto"
 Waterloo Tänze

Four hands

 Melodic Practice Pieces, Op. 149
 Sonatas, Op. 32, Op. 33, Op. 37, Op. 38, Op. 54, Op. 58, Op. 60, and Op. 73
 2 Cute Sonatas and Military Rondo, Op. 150
 "The Friends Of The Children"; six easy sonatinas, Op. 163
 Sonatinas, Op. 24, Op. 50, Op. 53, Op. 85, Op. 117 and Op. 152

Music for guitar

One guitar

 Funeral March for the Death of Michael Haydn, Op. 20 PDF
 Sonata in C major, Op. 29, No. 1
 Sonata in A major, Op. 29, No. 2
 Sonata in F major, Op. 29, No. 3
 Recital Piece for Amateurs, Op. 39
 Two Rondos and Two Fugues, Op. 46
 10 Light Pieces, Op. 89
 7 Preludes, Op.103 (before 1829) PDF 
 Gran Variazioni sopra la cavatina dell’ Opera Tancredi, Op.104
 12 Light Ländler, Op. 127
 Apollo am Damentoilette PDF
 Amusements pour les Dames PDF
 24 Light Old-Vienna Ländler
 5 Viennese Dances
 4 Rondinos

Two guitars

 Orpheus, Op. 12 PDF
 Romance ( La Sentinelle)
 Romance ( Partant pour la Syrie)
 Romance ( Vous me quittez)
 Russiches Volklied (Schöne Minka ich muss scheiden)
 Melodie (Im Arm der Liebe ruht sichs so wohl)
 Melodie (An Alexis send' ich dich)
 Melodie (Nimm diess kleine Angedenken)
 Variations on a Favorite Theme, Op. 57
 Serenade No.3, Op.63 PDF
 4th Serenade, Op. 96
 Great Serenade, Op. 100
 Cycle On "La Gazza Ladra" By Rossini

Three guitars

 Trio in F major, Op. 62

Guitar and piano

 3 Pieces for guitar and fortepiano, Op. 10
 Sonatina, Op. 68 and Op. 70 (or for violin and piano)
 Sonata, Op. 71
 Variations sur un theme favori de Rode, Op. 97
 Grande Sonate brillante, Op. 102
 4 Leichte und angenehme Rondino, Op.140
 6 Ecossaises
 Pezzi Facili
 Andante con Espressione

Guitar and other instruments

 Serenade for flute and guitar, Op. 99
 Serenata Concertante for flute or violin and viola or guitar, Op. 105
 Notturno for csakan, viola & guitar, Op. 123
 Notturno, for clarinet & guitar
 Duo in A major for violin and guitar
 Duo in D major for violin and guitar
 6 Original Austrian Folk Songs for csakan and guitar
 3 pieces for flute and guitar
 Potpourri No.1 from the Favorite Works of Beethoven for flute (or violin) & guitar
 Trio for 2 violins and guitar

Guitar and voice

 4 Songs
 Music
 Homage
 Memory
 People's Destiny

Music for voice

 "Sechs charakteristische Gesänge", Op. 91 for Voice, Flute and Guitar
 "Lieder der Liebe und Zärtlichkeit", Op. 98 for Voice, Flute and Guitar
 "Gesänge Für Herz und Gefühl", Op. 101 for Voice, Flute and Guitar
 Country Mass in E-flat major for Solos, Chorus, and Orchestra, Op. 107
 Pastoral Mass in F major for Solos, Chorus, and Orchestra, Op. 147
 Mass in C major for Chorus, Two trumpets, Two Violins, and Figured Bass
 Mass in B major with A "Jubilate Deo" Offertory for Chorus, Two Violins, and Figured Bass
 Mass in G major for Solos, Chorus, and Orchestra
 "Jubilate Deo Omnis Terra" for Chorus, Two Violins, and Figured Bass
 "Puer Natus Est Nobis"; gradual for chorus and orchestra
 "Angelus Ad Pastores"; motet for soprano, chorus, and orchestra
 "Prope Est Dominus" for Chorus, Strings, and Organ, Op. 166
 "Cantate Domino" for Chorus, Two Violins, and Figured Bass
 "The Mayor Election" for Five Male Voices and Strings
 "In te Domine speravi", for chorus, orchestra
 "Virgo Maria", for chorus, orchestra & organ

Miscellaneous
 Grand Cello Sonata, Op. 92
 Heroic Music for 6 trumpets and timpani
 12 Processional Fanfares for trumpet & timpani
 Rossini Waltzes of Favorite Themes from "The Barber of Seville," for 2 violins & double bass
 6 Walzer für den Karneval, for 2 violins and double bass
 Viennese Dance for orchestra

Diabelli